The Odacidae are a small family of ray-finned fishes formerly classified within the order Perciformes, commonly known as cales, and weed whitings. They are related to the much larger families of the wrasses and parrotfish. More recent workers have classified this family within the order Labriformes, alongside the wrasses and parrotfishes, within the clade Percomorpha.

Odacids are found in coastal waters off Southern Australia and New Zealand. They include species that feed on small invertebrates, as well as herbivorous grazers, some of which are able to feed on chemically unpleasant varieties of kelp otherwise unpalatable to fish.

Genera
The following genera are classified in the family Odacidae:

Haletta Whitley, 1947
Heteroscarus Castelnau, 1872
Neoodax Castelnau, 1875
Odax Valenciennes, 1840
Parodax Scott, 1976 (synonymous with Siphonognathus according to Fishbase
Olisthops Richardson, 1850
Sheardichthys Whitley, 1947 (synonymous with Siphonognathus according to Fishbase
Siphonognathus Richardson, 1858

Fishbase places six species in the genus Siphonognathus, the Catalog of Fishes places four of the six species in the separate genus Sheardichthys and places S. caninis on the monospecific genus Parodax, leaving Siphonognathus as a monospecific genus containing only S. argyrophanes.

References

 

 
Labriformes
Ray-finned fish families
Taxa named by Albert Günther